Events in the year 1871 in Norway.

Incumbents
Monarch: Charles IV

Events

Arts and literature

Notable births

27 January – Bodil Katharine Biørn, missionary known as Mother Katharine (died 1960)
1 February – Helmer Hermandsen, rifle shooter and Olympic silver medallist (died 1958)
26 March – Karl Haagensen, gymnast and Olympic gold medallist (died 1918)
1 April – F. Melius Christiansen, violinist and choral conductor (died 1955)
24 May – Henry Larssen, judge.
26 June – Johan Anker, sailor, yacht designer and double Olympic gold medallist (died 1940)
22 July – Jon Skeie, jurist (died 1951).
20 September – Jonas Pedersen, politician (died 1953)
11 October – Johan Oscar Smith,  Christian leader, founder of the Brunstad Christian Church (died 1943)
22 November – Hans Clarin Hovind Mustad, businessperson (died 1948)
24 December – Vilhelm Krag, author (died 1933)

Full date unknown
Agnar Johannes Barth, forester (died 1948)
Haakon Hauan, politician and Minister (died 1961)
Gabriel Kielland, architect, painter and designer (died 1960)
Odd Sverressøn Klingenberg, politician and Minister (died 1944)
Magnus Nilssen, politician and Minister (died 1947)

Notable deaths

4 June – Frederik Holst, medical doctor (born 1791).
3 July – Carl Andreas Fougstad, politician (born 1806)
22 October – Claus Winter Hjelm, judge (born 1797)

See also

References